Mansour Seddiq Nammazi (born March 13, 1993) is a Saudi football player who plays a defender .

References

External links 
 

1993 births
Living people
Saudi Arabian footballers
Ittihad FC players
Hajer FC players
Al-Fayha FC players
Al-Qous FC players
Saudi First Division League players
Saudi Professional League players
Saudi Fourth Division players
Association football defenders